Islam is a minority religion in all of the countries and territories of the Americas, around 1% of North America population are Muslims, and 0.1% of Latin America and Caribbean population are Muslims.

Suriname has the highest percentage of Muslims in its population for the region, with 13.9% or 75,053	individuals, according to its 2012 census. However, the United States, in which estimates vary due to a lack of a census question, is generally believed to have the largest population, with approximately 3.45 million Muslims living there, about 1.1 percent of the total U.S. population. 

Most Muslims in the former British Caribbean came from the Indian subcontinent as indentured servants following the abolition of slavery. This movement also reached Suriname, although other Muslims there moved from a separate Dutch colony, which is now Indonesia. In the United States, the largest Muslim ethnic group is of African Americans, who converted in the last century, including those who converted from the actions of the syncretic, radical and revisionist group known as the Nation of Islam. However, in South America, the Muslim population is mainly composed of upper-class immigrants from the Levant, including those from Lebanon and Syria.

Shias in the Americas 

Shia Muslims comprise 15-20% of Muslims in the Americas; which is nearly 786,000 to 2.500.000 persons in the U.S.
Shia Muslims are situated on United States. The American Shia Muslim community are from different parts of the world such as South Asia, Europe, Middle East, and East Africa.

The American Shia Muslim community have many activities and have founded several organization such as the Islamic Center of America and North America Shia Ithna-Asheri Muslim Communities Organization (NASIMCO).

The first group of immigrant Shiites (Shias) migrated to the United States from Lebanon and Syria about one hundred and eighty years ago (1824-1878). These Shiite Muslims migrated to cities such as Detroit, Michigan, and Ross (California) and North Dakota.

Population by country
The population of Muslims varies across the Americas. Below is the percentage of every American country that was Muslim in 2010, according to a Pew Research Center estimate:
 Suriname - 15.2%
 Guyana - 6.4% 
 Trinidad and Tobago - 6%
 Canada - 2.1%
 St. Vincent and the Grenadines - 1.5%
 British Virgin Islands - 1.2%
 United States - 1.1%
 Bermuda - 1.1%
 Argentina - 1.0%
 Barbados - 1.0%
 French Guiana - 1%
 Panama - 0.7%
 Antigua and Barbuda - 0.6%
 Cayman Islands - 0.4%
 Guadeloupe - 0.4%
 Anguilla - 0.3%
 Grenada - 0.3%
 St. Kitts and Nevis - 0.3%
 Haiti - 0.3%
 Aruba - 0.2%
 Caribbean Netherlands - 0.2%
 Curaçao - 0.2%
 Martinique - 0.2%
 Sint Maarten - 0.2%
 St. Pierre and Miquelon - 0.2%
 Bahamas - 0.1%
 Belize - 0.1%
 Dominica - 0.1%
 Honduras - 0.1%
 St. Lucia - 0.1%
 U.S. Virgin Islands - 0.1%
 Bolivia - 0.1%
 Brazil - 0.1%
 Chile - 0.1%
 Colombia - 0.1%
 Costa Rica - 0.1%
 Cuba - 0.1%
 Dominican Republic - 0.1%
 Ecuador - <0.1%
 El Salvador - <0.1%
Falkland Islands (Islas Malvinas) - <0.1%
 Greenland - <0.1%
 Guatemala - <0.1%
 Venezuela - 0.1%
 Jamaica - 0.1%
 Mexico - 0.1%
 Montserrat - <0.1%
 Paraguay	 - <0.1%
 Peru - 0.1%
 Puerto Rico - 0.1%
 Turks and Caicos Islands - <0.1%
 Uruguay - 0.1%

Immigrant Muslims in America 
In regards to Immigrant Muslims in America: at first, a population of African Muslims entered the United States as slaves, and at the next stage, while the immigration laws to this country eased the conditions for accepting immigrants from all over the world, another population of Muslim people entered there. In the last 25 years, new waves of immigrants as well as the tendency of a large group of American blacks to Islam have caused an increase in the number of Muslims in America. According to one of the professors of the University of Massachusetts, USA, the number of Muslims in America is estimated to be three to four million people, and is appraised that two thirds of this population are "immigrants and their children" apart from Muslim Americans.

In 1991, more than 100,000 immigrants entered the United States legally, most of whom were people (mostly Muslim) from Pakistan, India, Iran, Lebanon, Egypt and Bangladesh. Also, another unknown figure should be allocated to illegal Muslim immigrants who entered the United States this year.

See also
 Islam in South Asia
 Islam in Europe
 Islam in Oceania
 Organisation of Islamic Cooperation

References

Americas
 
 
Religion in the Americas
Religion in North America
Religion in South America